Andranovondronina is a municipality in northern Madagascar, along with holding the status as most northern town on the island. It belongs to the district of Antsiranana II, which is a part of the Diana Region. According to the 2001 census the population of Andranovondronina was 2,372.

Only primary schooling is available in the town. Agriculture provides employment for 14% and 75% of the working population. The principal crop is maize, while other important products are cassava and rice. Services provide employment for 0.5% of the population. Additionally fishing employs 10.5% of the population.

Cap Ambre
The northernmost point in Madagascar is situated in this municipality: the Cape Ambre or Tanjona Bobaomby. The creation of a national park is under way in this area.

References and notes

Populated places in Diana Region